The Free State Project (FSP) is an American political migration movement founded in 2001 to recruit at least 20,000 libertarians to move to a single low-population state (New Hampshire was selected in 2003) in order to make the state a stronghold for libertarian ideas. The New Hampshire Union Leader reports that the Free State Project is not a political party but a nonprofit organization.

Participants of the FSP signed a statement of intent declaring that they intended to move to New Hampshire within five years of the drive reaching 20,000 participants. This statement of intent was intended to function as a form of assurance contract. , 20,000 people have signed this statement of intent, completing the original goal, and 1,909 people are listed as "early movers" to New Hampshire on the FSP website, saying they had made their move prior to the 20,000-participant trigger. In the 2017–2018 term of the 400-member New Hampshire House of Representatives, 17 seats were held by Free Staters.

The FSP is a social movement generally based upon decentralized decision making. The group hosts various events, but most of FSP's activities depend upon volunteers & no formal plan dictates to participants or movers what their actions should be in New Hampshire.

As of May 2022, approximately 6,232 participants have moved to New Hampshire for the Free State Project.

Intent
The FSP mission statement, adopted in 2005, states: 

"Life, liberty, and property" are rights that were enumerated in the October 1774 Declaration and Resolves of the First Continental Congress and in Article 12 of the New Hampshire Constitution.

To become a participant of the Free State Project, a person is asked to agree to the Statement of Intent (SOI): 

The FSP is open to people with a minimum age of 18. United States citizenship is not required. People who promote violence, racial hatred, or bigotry are not welcome in the FSP.

History
The Free State Project was founded in 2001 by Jason Sorens, then a Ph.D. student at Yale University. Sorens published an article in The Libertarian Enterprise highlighting the failure of libertarians to elect any candidate to federal office and outlining his ideas for a secessionist movement, calling people to respond to him with interest. Sorens soon published a follow-up article  backing away from secession, "and it never played a role in the FSP’s philosophy from then on." Sorens has stated that the movement continues an American tradition of political migration, which includes groups such as Mormon settlers in Utah, Amish religious communities, and the "Jamestown Seventy", an earlier effort to influence the politics of a particular state through deliberate migration.

The organization began without a specific state in mind. A systematic review started by narrowing potential states to those with a population of less than 1.5 million, and those where the combined spending in 2000 by the Democratic and Republican parties was less than the total national spending by the Libertarian Party in that year, $5.2 million. Hawaii & Rhode Island were eliminated from this list because of their propensity for centralized government.

In September 2003, a vote was held, and participants voted using the minimax Condorcet method to choose the state that they were to move to. New Hampshire was the winner, with Wyoming coming in second by a 57% to 43% margin. Alaska, Delaware, Idaho, Maine, Montana, North Dakota, South Dakota & Vermont were also on the list. New Hampshire was chosen because the perceived individualist culture of the state was thought to resonate well with libertarian ideals.

In 2004, following the selection of New Hampshire, a splinter group called the Free Town Project formed to move to the small town of Grafton and advocate for legal changes there. Grafton's appeal as a favorable destination was due to its absence of zoning laws and a very low property tax rate. Additionally, it was the home of John Babiarz, a prominent member of the Libertarian Party who had twice run for Governor. Though no records were kept of the number of Free Town Project participants who moved to Grafton, the town's population grew from 1,138 in 2000 to 1,340 in 2010. Project participants fashioned homes out of yurts, recreational vehicles, trailers, tents, and shipping containers. The changes they voted in included a 30% reduction in the town's budget, denying funding to the county's senior-citizens council.

In 2005, members of the Free Town Project were also briefly involved with Mentone, Texas. Mentone is in Loving County, at the time the least populous county in the United States. Three men, Lawrence Pendarvis, Bobby Emory, and Don Duncan, claimed to have bought 126 acres (51 ha) of land and registered to vote there, although the sheriff determined that the land was not sold to the group, as no deed had been filed at the county courthouse. He contacted the sellers who said that the land had been sold to other buyers, after which the sheriff filed misdemeanor charges against the three men and threatened to arrest them if they returned.

On 3 February 2016, the Free State Project announced via social media that 20,000 people had signed the Statement of Intent. In a press conference later that day, then FSP president Carla Gericke officially announced that the move had been triggered and that signers were expected to follow up on their pledge. This concluded the Free Town Project, and the Free State Project organization changed focus from recruiting signers to encouraging them to move to New Hampshire, stating "we want 20,000 movers".

Electoral activity
The Free State Project is not aligned with any political party and has no official position for or against any issues or candidates. That said, however, the Free State Project is defined as a movement that seeks to relocate people of broadly libertarian ideals, specifically. It receives its funding from individual donors interested in moving as part of the FSP or in attending one of their annual events. The FSP is a tax-exempt nonprofit educational organization, falling under category 501(c)(3), so all donations since 20 July 2009 are tax-deductible.

Several early movers have been elected to the 400-member New Hampshire House of Representatives. In 2006, Joel Winters became the first known Free Stater to be elected, running as a Democrat. He was re-elected in 2008 but defeated in 2010.

In 2010, twelve Free Staters were elected to the New Hampshire House of Representatives, all of them as Republicans. In 2012, eleven more were elected. In 2012, elected participants wrote and passed House Bill 418 which would require state agencies to consider open source software and data formats when making acquisitions; However, the bill died in the NH State Senate.

In 2014, eighteen Free Staters were elected. In 2016, fifteen of thirty-two Free Stater candidates were elected.

In 2017, there were seventeen Free Staters in the New Hampshire House of Representatives, and, in 2021, the New Hampshire Liberty Alliance, which ranks bills & elected representatives based on their adherence to what they see as libertarian principles, scored 150 representatives as "A-" or above rated representatives. Participants of the FSP also engage with other like-minded activist groups such as Rebuild New Hampshire, Young Americans for Liberty, and Americans for Prosperity.

In 2022, the Croydon school board president and her husband, members of the Free Society Project, attempted to cut the school budget by half in a surprise but licit maneuver on the day of the vote, in a district with typically low attendance for votes. The plan that passed offered students online learning from a facilitator or $9,000 to go to an alternate public or private school. This plan was claimed to be an “adequate education” under the NH constitutional requirement. In response, local residents organized to overturn the budget. They needed more than half of the eligible voters to vote in a special election and a majority of those voters to vote for the fully-funded budget. In this special election, the Free Society position was that staying home and not voting was a no vote. The Free Society Project school budget was overruled 377 to 2, with just under two thirds of the eligible voters motivated to go to the polls, and the original budget was restored.

Annual events
The Free State Project organizes two annual events in New Hampshire:
 The New Hampshire Liberty Forum, a convention-style event with a wide variety of speakers, dinners & events.
 The Porcupine Freedom Festival, commonly abbreviated to just "PorcFest", a weeklong summer festival that takes place at a campground. It was described by Libertarian philosophy professor Roderick Long as "like Woodstock for rational people".

Responses

Support 
On February 17, 2006, economist Walter Block publicly expressed his support for the FSP and was quoted as saying:

Jeffrey Tucker reflected about his experiences at the New Hampshire Liberty Forum in Nashua, saying in part: "If you are willing to look past mainstream media coverage of American politics, you can actually find exciting and interesting activities taking place that rise above lobbying, voting, graft and corruption".

The project was endorsed by Ron Paul and Gary Johnson. In 2010, Lew Rockwell from the Mises Institute endorsed the project and referred to the city of Keene, New Hampshire as "the northern capital of libertarianism". In 2011, Peter Schiff said he had considered moving to NH at one point.

Some Republicans have responded more favorably to the project. In September 2014, Republican Party Senate nominee Scott Brown, a former United States Senator from Massachusetts, said his election campaign needed "Freestaters" to support him in his one-minute closing statement at the Granite State Debate.

Former Maine state senator Eric Brakey partially attributed the Republican Party's 2020 election gains to the Free State Project.

Criticism 
Critics argue that the Free State Project is "radical", a "fantasy", or that they "go too far" in seeking to restrict government. The project has drawn criticism from some New Hampshire residents concerned about population pressure and opposition to increased taxation. In December 2012, state representative Cynthia Chase (D-Keene) said, "Free Staters are the single biggest threat the state is facing today. There is, legally, nothing we can do to prevent them from moving here to take over the state, which is their openly stated goal. In this country you can move anywhere you choose and they have that same right. What we can do is to make the environment here so unwelcoming that some will choose not to come, and some may actually leave. One way is to pass measures that will restrict the 'freedoms' that they think they will find here".

During and shortly after the Free Town Project was active in Grafton County, there were three bear attacks. Several media outlets argued that there was a relationship between the Free Town Project and the bear attacks, and a book was written on the subject by local state reporter Matt Hongoltz-Hetling.

In 2012, the Concord Police Department applied for $258,000 in federal government funding to buy a Lenco BearCat armored vehicle for protection against terrorist attacks, riots, or shooting incidents. The application mentioned "Free Staters" alongside Sovereign Citizens and Occupy New Hampshire as groups that "are active and present daily challenges". The grant from the United States Department of Homeland Security was successful, but the Concord City Council revised the application to remove references to those political movements before unanimously approving of the grant.

A 2022 survey found relatively little awareness of the Free State Project in New Hampshire but generally negative opinions among those familiar: 10% expressed a favorable view and 26% an unfavorable one.

Media coverage 
The Free State Project was the centerpiece of the 2011 documentary film Libertopia as well as the 2014 crowdfunded documentary 101 Reasons: Liberty Lives in New Hampshire.

See also

 Adelsverein
 American Redoubt
 Anarcho-capitalism
 Foot voting
 Free West Alliance
 Fusionism
 Jason Sorens
 Libertarian conservatism
 Libertarian Republican
 Libertarian Party of New Hampshire
 Libertarianism in the United States
 New Hampshire Liberty Alliance
 Night-watchman state
 Objectivism
 Paleolibertarianism
 Politics of New Hampshire
 Right-libertarianism
 Voluntaryism

References

Further reading

External links
 Free State Project official website
 
 Organizational Profile – National Center for Charitable Statistics (Urban Institute)
 
 Free State Project A Libertarian Testing Ground  magazine article

Politically motivated migrations
Politics of New Hampshire
Libertarian organizations based in the United States
2001 establishments in the United States
Libertarianism in the United States
Political activism
Political advocacy groups in the United States
Political opposition
New Hampshire culture